Erwin Ringel (April 27, 1921 – July 28, 1994) was an Austrian psychiatrist and neurologist who dedicated his life to suicide prevention and who, in 1960, defined the presuicidal syndrome.

In 1960 he founded the International Association for Suicide Prevention.

Childhood and early Life 
Erwin Ringel was born in Timișoara, Romania to a Banat Swabian family, nonetheless his parents already lived in Hollabrunn, Austria.

In 1926 his family moved to Vienna which gave young Erwin the opportunity to visit Vienna's famous Operahouse and Burgtheater.

Honours and awards
 1961: Karl Renner Vienna's prize for achievement in suicide prevention
 1985: Honorary President of the International Association for Suicide Prevention
 1986: Austrian Cross of Honour for Science and Art, 1st class
 1986: Gold Medal for services to the City of Vienna
 1988: Hans-Prinzhorn Medal

1921 births
1994 deaths
Austrian psychiatrists
Austrian neurologists
Physicians from Vienna
Recipients of the Austrian Cross of Honour for Science and Art, 1st class
20th-century Austrian physicians